The Irving Oil Refinery is a Canadian oil refinery located in Saint John, New Brunswick. Over 80 per cent of the production is exported to the United States, accounting for 19 per cent of the country's gasoline imports and 75 per cent of Canada's gasoline exports to the US.

The refinery is owned and operated by Irving Oil Limited Refining Division, a subsidiary company of Irving Oil.

History
The refinery was built in 1960 as a partnership between Irving Oil and Standard Oil Co. of California (SOCAL) on a  site in Saint John, New Brunswick. It was built to allow for expansions, the first of which occurred in 1971 and then again in 1974. In 2000, a larger, $1.5 billion upgrade was completed. Irving Oil bought out SOCAL's share in the early 1980s.

The refinery is supplied with crude oil primarily delivered by supertankers to the company's Canaport deep-water terminal which was commissioned in 1970; prior to 1970, crude oil was delivered to the refinery through a much smaller terminal located on Courtney Bay immediately north of the Saint John Shipbuilding property. After Canaport opened, this terminal was converted to exclusively export the refinery's output. In 2011 the refinery built a rail terminal for receiving crude oil; the refinery is served by tracks owned by Canadian National but which are operated by New Brunswick Southern Railway.

In July 2010, Irving Oil cancelled plans for an $8-billion project, known as Eider Rock, which would have seen a second refinery built south of Saint John adjacent to the Canaport property with its partner BP. Irving and BP claimed "the demand for refined fuel had dropped and the capital costs of a new refinery were higher than expected." Construction had been scheduled to start in 2011 and at its peak, the refinery project was predicted to create 5,000 construction jobs and 1,000 permanent jobs. In February 2011, Fort Reliance Co. Ltd., Irving Oil Ltd.'s parent company, also cancelled its $30-million project to build a new headquarters at Long Wharf on property owned by the Port of Saint John.

In 2015, Irving Oil said it was no longer importing Bakken shale oil, but was taking cheaper crudes from Saudi Arabia.

Conservative politician Andrew Scheer stated in November 2017 that Canada should ban the import of oil from Saudi Arabia due to human rights and environmental concerns. In December 2018 Scheer demanded that the gender-based analysis requirement imposed on Canadian pipeline projects by the Liberal government be instead applied to oil imported from Saudi Arabia. 

It came to light because of the 2019 Abqaiq–Khurais attack that virtually all the 115,000 barrels per day of imported Saudi oil that is processed in Canada is processed at the Irving oil refinery. Canada accounted for 1.5 per cent of exports from Saudi Arabia in 2018, when the refinery produced from Saudi oil one-third of its total output.

Rail accidents
On 6 July 2013, a train carrying crude oil from the Bakken Formation in North Dakota destined for the Irving Refinery derailed in Lac-Mégantic, Quebec, causing an explosion in the town center of Lac-Mégantic and killing 47 people.

On 7 January 2014, another train carrying crude from Manitoba to the Irving Refinery derailed in Plaster Rock. This derailment caused explosions and fireballs and forced 150 people to evacuate their homes but did not cause any injuries.

Proposed pipeline 

In July 2013 TC PipeLines announced a proposal to build the Energy East pipeline. This followed a February 2013 meeting between New Brunswick Premier David Alward and Alberta Premier Alison Redford, whereby New Brunswick announced its support for Alberta's call to export landlocked oil sands crude oil bitumen.

Getting Alberta crude oil to tidewater, such as the Canaport facility, would provide access to overseas markets using oil tankers whereby the oil would presumably command a higher price using the international Brent Crude index than it currently does in the western United States using the West Texas Intermediate index. Premier Redford described the Irving Oil refinery as an "anchor ... with the possibility of also exporting some of that crude by tanker."

In October 2017, Irving Oil’s joint venture partner, TransCanada, announced it will be terminating the Energy East pipeline project as a result of changing circumstances around the project.

References

External links
 J.D. Irving Ltd
 Fort Reliance Company Ltd - Bloomberg Businessweek listing
 Irving Oil

Companies based in Saint John, New Brunswick
Buildings and structures in Saint John, New Brunswick
Oil refineries in Canada